is a Japanese manga series written and illustrated by Icchokusen Mōkon. It began serialization in Fusion Product's Comic Be magazine in 2012, and was collected in two tankōbon volumes. The series was renewed for serialization in the same magazine in 2014. A 12-episode anime television series adaptation animated by Pierrot+ aired from April 2 to June 18, 2018.

Plot
An unpopular pop idol and middle high school student Saki Uno discovers that her mother, Sayori, used to be a "magical girl", but, as a result of back problems, found it necessary to pass her position down to Saki. With the help of a Yakuza-like mascot character named Kokoro-chan, Saki is able to transform into "Magical Girl Ore" to fight the cute-faced demons who threaten to kidnap her crush, Mohiro. Unfortunately, her magical girl form is that of a large, healthy, athletic, muscular man in a small, cute, girlish uniform, which is causing endless embarrassment to Saki. The situation becomes even more complicated when Mohiro becomes attracted to Saki's manly "Ore" form, and Saki's idol partner Sakuyo reveals her own attraction to Saki.

Characters
 / 

The main protagonist of story and the singer of the pop idol duo "Magical Twin," which has yet to have any real success. She transforms into "Magical Girl Ore" to save her crush Mohiro from being kidnapped by demons. 
 / 

Saki's best friend and co-singer in Magical Twin. She also has the ability to transform into a Magical Girl to protect her crush, Saki. Her appearance and character are so similar to the brother's that her male form looks like a more developed Mohiro.
 / 

Saki's mother who is actually was a Magical Girl.

Popular idol singer and Sakuyo's brother who rarely seems to speak or emote outside of his concerts. It seems that he really is attracted to Saki's male form, which constantly confuses her.

Co-star and singer in Mohiro's group.

The manager of Saki and Sakuyo, who reveals himself to be an avid magical girl fan.

The magical fairy and "mascot character" to the Magical Girls, even though he looks and speaks like a stereotypical Yakuza. He can appear almost anywhere to assist the Magical Girls, and provide them with different kinds of "magical" weaponry.

A self-proclaimed cyborg hero with a tragic backstory who is annoyed that Magical Girls don't have one. His powers include "rapidly pedaling a bicycle" and "quickly changing clothes," along with a laser-firing belt that has no tangible effects. Fujimoto also claims to be from a poor family of similar cyborgs, and has met Saki's mother in Magical Girl form in the past.
Michiru Ogawa / 

Anime-only Magical Girl, who sings in idol duo together with her partner Ruka. She is a tsundere and often unsuccessfully trying to hide her true feelings, which only strengthens Ruka's attraction to her. 
Ruka Kiryu / 
Voiced by: Yumi Uchiyama (before transformation, female), Tatsuhisa Suzuki (after transformation, male)
Anime-only Magical Girl, who is unambiguously in love with her partner Michiro from the idol duo, thanks to which she immediately becomes capable of transformation.

Anime-only Mascot, who admires Kokoro and will do anything to gain his attention.

Media

Anime
A 12-episode anime television series adaptation by Pierrot+ aired from April 2 to June 18, 2018. Crunchyroll co-produced the series and is streamed the anime worldwide, except in Japan and Greater China. Discotek Media will release the series on home video.

Episode list

Notes

References

External links
  
 

Anime series based on manga
Comedy anime and manga
Crunchyroll anime
Discotek Media
Japanese LGBT-related animated television series
Josei manga
Magical boy
Magical girl parodies
Studio Signpost
Transgender in anime and manga
Magical girl anime and manga